Atagulisaktalik (Inuktitut syllabics: ᐊᑕᒍᓕᓴᒃᑕᓕᒃ)  formerly Revoir Pass is a mountain pass in the central Baffin Mountains, Nunavut, Canada. It is named after the Revoir River.

Atagulisaktalik connects the inner reaches of Arviqtujuq Kangiqtua westwards through Ottawa Creek with Swiss Bay in Sam Ford Fiord.

See also
Ayr Pass

References

Arctic Cordillera
Mountain passes of Baffin Island